Gary Joseph Sullivan (born 1960) is an American electrical engineer who led the development of the AVC, HEVC, and VVC video coding standards and created the DirectX Video Acceleration (DXVA) API/DDI video decoding feature of the Microsoft Windows operating system.

He was the chairman and a co-founder of the Joint Video Team (JVT) standardization committee that developed the H.264/AVC standard, and he personally edited large portions of it. In January 2010, he became a founding co-chairman of the Joint Collaborative Team on Video Coding (JCT-VC) and an editor for developing the High Efficiency Video Coding (HEVC) standard. In October 2015, he became a founding co-chairman of the Joint Video Experts Team (JVET) that developed the Versatile Video Coding (VVC) standard. He has also led and contributed to a number of other video and image related standardization projects such as extensions of ITU-T H.263 video coding, multiview and 3D video coding for AVC and HEVC, and JPEG XR image coding. He has also published research work on various topics relating to video and image compression.

Biography
Sullivan was born and raised in Louisville, Kentucky, and attended the Ascension and St. Margaret Mary elementary schools and Trinity High School, graduating in 1978. He received B.S. and M.Eng. degrees in electrical engineering from the University of Louisville J. B. Speed School of Engineering, Kentucky, in 1982 and 1983, respectively. He received Ph.D. and Engineer degrees in electrical engineering from the University of California, Los Angeles, in 1991.

Sullivan holds the position of Video and Image Technology Architect at Microsoft Corporation. At Microsoft he also designed and remains lead engineer for the DirectX Video Acceleration (DXVA) API/DDI video decoding feature of the Microsoft Windows operating system platform. His DXVA designs include decoding acceleration schemes for H.261, MPEG-1 Part 2, H.262/MPEG-2 Part 2, H.263, MPEG-4 Part 2, H.264/MPEG-4 Part 10: AVC, Windows Media Video versions 8 and 9, VC-1, Scalable Video Coding, Multiview Video Coding, and HEVC.

Prior to joining Microsoft in 1999, he was the manager of communications core research at PictureTel Corporation, the former world leader in videoconferencing communication. He was previously a Howard Hughes Fellow and member of technical staff in the Advanced Systems Division of Hughes Aircraft Company, and a terrain-following radar system software engineer for Texas Instruments.

Awards
Recognitions and awards for Sullivan and the projects he has led in the standardization community have included the following:
 2022 class of ACM Fellows, "for contributions to video and image compression and leadership in its standardization".
 Fellow of the Society of Motion Picture and Television Engineers (SMPTE) for "individuals who have, by proficiency and contributions, attained an outstanding rank among engineers or executives, in the motion-picture, television or related industries", 2022
 Digital Processing Medal of SMPTE for innovation and industry leadership in image and video compression, 2019
 Primetime Emmy Engineering Award – awarded to the JCT-VC standards committee by the Academy of Television Arts and Sciences for development of the High Efficiency Video Coding (HEVC) standard, 2017
 Best Paper Award of IEEE Transactions on Circuits and Systems for Video Technology, 2017 (together with Thiow Keng Tan, Rajitha Weerakkody, Marta Mrak, Naeem Ramzan, Vittorio Baroncini, and Jens-Rainer Ohm)
 Best Paper Award of IEEE Transactions on Circuits and Systems for Video Technology, 2013 (together with Jens-Rainer Ohm, Woo-Jin Han, and Thomas Wiegand)
 IEEE Masaru Ibuka Consumer Electronics Award (together with Gisle Bjøntegaard and Thomas Wiegand), 2012
 Fellow of the Society of Photo-Optical Instrumentation Engineers (SPIE) for achievements in video and image compression technologies, 2009
 J. B. Speed Professional Award in Engineering, 2009
 Paired Technology & Engineering Emmy Awards – one awarded to VCEG and one to MPEG by the National Academy of Television Arts and Sciences for development of the H.264/MPEG-4 AVC standard, 2009
 Primetime Emmy Engineering Award – awarded to the JVT standards committee by the Academy of Television Arts and Sciences for development of the High Profile of H.264/MPEG-4 AVC, 2008
 International Multimedia Telecommunications Consortium (IMTC) Leadership award, 2008
 Institute of Electrical and Electronics Engineers (IEEE) Consumer Electronics Engineering Excellence Award, 2008
 Fellow of the IEEE for contributions to video coding and its standardization, 2006
 The video coding work of the ITU-T led by Sullivan for the preceding ten years was voted as the most influential area of the standardization work of the CCITT and ITU-T in their 50-year history, 2006
 Technical Achievement award of the International Committee for Information Technology Standards (INCITS) for his work on H.264/MPEG-4 AVC and other video standardization topics, 2005

Leadership
Sullivan has held the following chairmanships in video coding standardization organizations:
 Rapporteur/chairman of the ITU-T Video Coding Experts Group (VCEG) of ITU-T Study Group 16 – since 1996
 Chairman and co-chairman of the video part of the ISO/IEC Moving Picture Experts Group (MPEG) – chairman March 2001 – May 2002, co-chairman since May 2002
 Chairman and co-chairman of the Joint Video Team – chairman for the development of the next generation H.264/MPEG-4 AVC video coding standard and its fidelity-range extensions (FRExt), and co-chairman for the development of the Scalable Video Coding (SVC) and Multiview Video Coding (MVC) extensions – December 2001 (group closed November 2009)
 Co-chairman of Joint Collaborative Team on Video Coding (JCT-VC) for developing the High Efficiency Video Coding (HEVC) standard – January 2010 (group closed July 2020)
 Co-chairman of Joint Collaborative Team on 3D Video Coding (JCT-3V) for developing 3D extensions of video coding standards – July 2012 (group closed June 2016)
 Co-chairman of the Joint Video Experts Team (JVET) for the development of the Versatile Video Coding standard – October 2015
 Chair-elect of ISO/IEC JTC 1/SC 29, June 2020
 Liaison representative to MPEG and JPEG from ITU-T on video and image coding topics
The JVT, JCT-VC, JCT-3V, and JVET have been joint projects between the VCEG and MPEG organizations.

See also
 Moving Picture Experts Group (MPEG)
 Video Coding Experts Group (VCEG)
 Joint Photographic Experts Group (JPEG)
 JPEG XR
 High Efficiency Video Coding (HEVC)
 H.264/MPEG-4 AVC
 H.263 and MPEG-4 Part 2
 H.262/MPEG-2 Part 2
 H.261 and MPEG-1 Part 2
 DirectX Video Acceleration
 Versatile Video Coding
 Windows Media Video
 VC-1

References

External links

Video coding standardization organizations
Joint Video Experts Team (JVET)
Joint Collaborative Team on Video Coding (JCT-VC)
Joint Collaborative Team on 3D Video (JCT-3V)
Joint Video Team (JVT)
ISO/IEC Moving Picture Experts Group (MPEG)
ITU-T Video Coding Experts Group (VCEG)
ITU-T Study Group 16 (SG16)

Video coding standards
ITU-T Rec. H.266, also standardized as ISO/IEC MPEG-I Part 3 (also known as VVC)
ITU-T Rec. H.265, also standardized as ISO/IEC MPEG-H Part 2 (also known as HEVC)
ITU-T Rec. H.264, also standardized as ISO/IEC MPEG-4 Part 10 (also known as AVC)
ISO/IEC MPEG-4 Part 2
ITU-T Rec. H.263
ITU-T Rec. H.262, also standardized as ISO/IEC MPEG-2 Video
ISO/IEC MPEG-1 Video
ITU-T Rec. H.261

DirectX Video Acceleration
DirectX Video Acceleration (DXVA)
DXVA for Video Decoding
DXVA for VP8 and VP9
DXVA for HEVC
DXVA for H.264/MPEG-4 AVC
DXVA for H.264/MPEG-4 MVC extensions
DXVA for H.264/MPEG-4 SVC extensions
DXVA for Windows Media Video v8, v9 and vA (Including SMPTE 421M "VC-1")
DXVA for H.261, MPEG-1, MPEG-2 (H.262), H.263, and MPEG-4 Part 2 
DXVA for MPEG-4 Part 2 Off-Host VLD Mode (archive link)
DXVA for MPEG-1 Off-Host VLD Mode

1960 births
Living people
American electrical engineers
Fellow Members of the IEEE
Fellows of the Association for Computing Machinery
Fellows of SPIE
Microsoft employees
Primetime Emmy Engineering Award winners
People from Louisville, Kentucky
Trinity High School (Louisville) alumni
UCLA Henry Samueli School of Engineering and Applied Science alumni
University of Louisville alumni